Cairo is a surname. Notable people with the surname include:

Ellery Cairo (born 1978), Dutch soccer player
Ferdinando del Cairo (1666–1748), Italian Baroque painter
Francesco Cairo (1607–1665), Italian painter
Miguel Cairo (born 1974), Major League Baseball player
Tommy Cairo (born 1958), American professional wrestler
Urbano Cairo (born 1957), Italian businessman and chairman of the Torino football club

Italian-language surnames